Third Baptist Church is a Baptist church in the United States located in St. Louis, Missouri.  It is affiliated with American Baptist Churches USA, the Cooperative Baptist Fellowship and the Southern Baptist Convention, and supports the work of the Baptist World Alliance.  Third Baptist Church was established in 1850, and moved to its current location at the corner of Grand Boulevard and Washington Avenue in 1885.

Third Baptist, one of the nation's historic churches, has for 150 years avoided strict denominationalism, and relies on the Baptist distinctives of:

 Autonomy of the Local Church
 Soul Competency of the Individual Believer 
 Biblical Authority 
 Two Ordinances (Baptism and Lord's Table or Communion) 
 Separation of church and state

External links
 Official Website

Churches in St. Louis
Baptist churches in Missouri
Religious organizations established in 1850
1850 establishments in Missouri